Herbert Huppertz (3 June 1919 – 8 June 1944) was a German Luftwaffe military aviator and fighter ace during World War II. He is credited between 68 and 73 aerial victories, depending on source, achieved in approximately 380 combat missions. This figure includes 28 aerial victories on the Eastern Front, and further victories over the Western Allies, including 17 four-engined bombers.

Born in Rheydt, Huppertz grew up in the Weimar Republic and Nazi Germany. He joined the military service in the Luftwaffe in 1937. Following flight training, he was posted to Jagdgeschwader 51 (JG 51—51st Fighter Wing) in 1939. Flying with this wing, Huppertz claimed his first aerial victory on 28 May 1940 on the Western Front during the Dunkirk evacuation. Fighting on the Eastern Front, Huppertz was awarded the Knight's Cross of the Iron Cross on 30 August 1941. He was made Staffelkapitän (squadron leader) of 12. Staffel (12th squadron) of Jagdgeschwader 1 (JG 1—1st Fighter Wing) in January 1942. Over the course of 1942, he also commanded 9. Staffel and 10. Staffel of Jagdgeschwader 5 (JG 5—5th Fighter Wing), before he was transferred to Jagdgeschwader 2 "Richthofen" (JG 2—2nd Fighter Wing) in November 1942. With JG 2, he commanded 3. Staffel, 10. Staffel and 12. Staffel. In March 1944, he was appointed Gruppenkommandeur (group commander) of III. Gruppe of JG 2. He was killed in action, shot down by a Republic P-47 Thunderbolt on 8 June 1944 during the Operation Overlord. Posthumously, Huppertz was awarded the Knight's Cross of the Iron Cross with Oak Leaves on 24 June 1944.

Early life and career
Huppertz was born on 3 June 1919 in Rheydt, present-day a borough of Mönchengladbach, at the time an independent city in the Rhine Province. Huppertz, the son of a postal inspector, joined the Luftwaffe in late 1937 as a Fahnenjunker (cadet). Following flight training, he was posted to 6. Staffel (6th squadron) of Jagdgeschwader 51 (JG 51—51st Fighter Wing), a squadron of II. Gruppe (2nd group) of JG 51, in autumn 1939.

World War II
World War II in Europe began on Friday, 1 September 1939, when German forces invaded Poland. On 20 October, 6. Staffel of JG 51 was a newly created squadron commanded by Oberleutnant Josef Priller based at Eutingen im Gäu. On 5 November, the Staffel officially became operational. On 9 February 1940, II. Gruppe was moved to Böblingen Airfield where it was subordinated to Jagdgeschwader 52 (JG 52—52nd Fighter Wing) and tasked with patrolling the Upper Rhine region during the Phoney War phase of World War II.

On 11 May 1940, the second day of the Battle of France, II. Gruppe flew ground attack missions in the Alsace region. Following the German advance into Belgium and France, 6. Staffel was moved to Dinant on 26 May. That day, remnants of the French Army and the British Expeditionary Force (BEF) were retreating towards Dunkirk. To save the BEF, the British under the cover of the Royal Air Force (RAF), had launched Operation Dynamo. On 28 May, Huppertz claimed his first aerial victory. He was credited with shooting down a Supermarine Spitfire fighter over the Dunkirk battle zone. For this achievement, Huppertz was awarded the Iron Cross 2nd Class on 30 May 1940.

In July 1940, the Luftwaffe began a series of air operations dubbed Kanalkampf (Channel Battle) over the English Channel against the RAF, which marked the beginning of the Battle of Britain. On 7 July, Huppertz claimed his second aerial victory, a Spitfire shot down northwest of Dungeness. On 5 October, II. Gruppe moved to an airfield at Mardyck, west of Dunkirk. Four days later, Huppertz received the Iron Cross 1st Class. He claimed his third aerial victory on 25 October, a Hawker Hurricane fighter shot down near Tunbridge Wells. On 20 October, Huppertz claimed a Spitfire fighter on a mission to London. His last aerial victory in 1940 was claimed on 14 November when he shot down another Spitfire fighter over the Thames Estuary. On 21 November, Huppertz was injured in a forced landing near Gravelines. The accident was caused by engine problems of his Messerschmitt Bf 109 E-1 (Werknummer 6199—factory number).

On 7 December, II. Gruppe was sent to Mannheim-Sandhofen for a period of replenishment and rest. On 14 February 1941, the Gruppe returned to Mardyck on the Channel Front. There, Huppertz claimed a Spitfire fighter shotdown near Dungeness on 11 March. II. Gruppe of JG 51 was withdrawn from the Channel Front in early June 1941 and ordered to Dortmund where the unit was reequipped with the Bf 109 F series.

Operation Barbarossa
On 15 June, IV. On 22 June, German forces launched Operation Barbarossa, the German invasion of the Soviet Union. JG 51, under the command of Oberstleutnant Werner Mölders, was subordinated to II. Fliegerkorps (2nd Air Corps), which as part of Luftflotte 2 (Air Fleet 2). JG 51 area of operation during Operation Barbarossa was over the right flank of Army Group Center in the combat area of the 2nd Panzer Group as well as the 4th Army.

On the first day of the invasion, Huppertz, who was flying with 12. Staffel commanded by Oberleutnant Karl-Gottfried Nordmann, claimed a Tupolev SB bomber shot down. Huppertz accounted for a Petlyakov Pe-2 bomber on 23 July. Three were lost from the 411 BAP (Bombardirovochnyy Aviatsionyy Polk—bomber aviation regiment) operating under the OSNAZ (Osoboye Naznachenie—Special purpose-unit or task force). German pilots submitted three claims.

On 9 August, Huppertz was shot down in his Bf 109 F-2 (Werknummer 8938) near Schatalowka. He was shot down by the air gunner Serzhant Listratow from the 57 BAP. That day, he had claimed two aerial victories when he shot down a Polikarpov I-16 fighter and a SB-3 bomber. Huppertz was then transferred to 9. Staffel of JG 51 where he claimed his last aerial victory on the Eastern Front on 25 August over an I-16 fighter, taking his total to 34 aerial victories. At the time, 9. Staffel was commanded by Oberleutnant Karl-Heinz Schnell. Huppertz was awarded the Knight's Cross of the Iron Cross on 30 August 1941.

Squadron leader
In September 1941, Huppertz was appointed Staffelkapitän (squadron leader) of 1. Staffel of the Ergänzungsgruppe of JG 51, a supplementary training group. At the time, the unit was based in Zerbst before moving to Düsseldorf and to Vannes-Meucon Airfield in mid October. In January 1942, the Staffel became part of the newly formed IV. Gruppe of Jagdgeschwader 1 (JG 1—1st Fighter Wing) where it thus became 12. Staffel of JG 1. IV. Gruppe first major task was Operation Donnerkeil, an air superiority operation to support the Kriegsmarine (German Navy) Operation Cerberus. During this operation, Huppertz claimed a Spitfire fighter shot down on 12 February. End-February to early March 1942, IV. Gruppe began relocating north to Trondheim. On 21 March, IV./JG 1 was renamed to III. Gruppe of Jagdgeschwader 5 (JG 5—5th Fighter Wing) and placed under the command of Hauptmann Günther Scholz. In consequence, Huppertz became the Staffelkapitän of 9. Staffel of JG 5.

On 2 April 1942, Huppertz attacked the de Havilland Mosquito W4056 aerial reconnaissance aircraft from the RAF No. 1 Photographic Reconnaissance Unit (No. 1 PRU) on a mission to Trondheim. The crew made a forced landing at the German Ørland Airfield and was taken prisoner of war. On 10 April, Huppertz shot down the Spitfire fighter AB307 from the No. 1 PRU. Its pilot, Flighing Officer Peter Geoffrey Charles Gimson was on an aerial reconnaissance mission searching for the German battleship . Although Gimsaon bailed out, his parachute failed to deploy and he fell to his death. On 1 May, 9. Staffel was renamed and became the 10. Staffel which was subordinated to IV. Gruppe of JG 5. On 10 May, Huppertz shot down Spitfire AB127 from No. 1 PRU. Flying Officer Ian Malcolm was also searching for Tirpitz when he was shot down and killed by Huppertz.

Huppertz left his 10. Staffel on 15 September to receive conversion training to the Focke Wulf Fw 190. He received his training at the Værløse Air Base near Copenhagen. That day, he was injured when his Fw 190 A-2 (Werknummer 122208) suffered engine failure resulting in a forced landing near Mogensbæk. He was hospitalized at Frederikshavn and released on 1 October.

With Jagdgeschwader 2 "Richthofen"

On 9 November 1942, Huppertz was transferred and appointed Staffelkapitän of 3. Staffel of Jagdgeschwader 2 "Richthofen" (JG 2—2nd Fighter Wing). He replaced Oberleutnant Elmar Resch who was injured in a flight accident the day before. At the time, I. Gruppe of JG 2 under command of Hauptmann Erich Hohagen, the Gruppe to which his Staffel was subordinated, was based in Triquerville on the English Channel. Huppertz was promoted to Hauptmann (captain) on 1 April 1943.

On 20 April 1943, Huppertz was transferred to III. Gruppe of JG 2 which was led by Hauptmann Egon Mayer. There, Huppertz was tasked with the formation of a new 10. Staffel. The former 10. Staffel was a fighter-bomber unit and had been detached from JG 2 on 6 April. Huppertz reformed 10. Staffel was initially based at Beaumont-le-Roger and equipped with Fw 190 A-5. In late June, the Staffel was declared operational readiness and moved to Vannes Airfield. There, Huppertz claimed a Lockheed P-38 Lightning F-5 aerial reconnaissance aircraft shot down on 29 June.

When Mayer was appointed Geschwaderkommodore (wing commander) of JG 2 on 25 June, Huppertz was again transferred. He took command of 12. Staffel from Oberleutnant Bruno Stolle on 1 July who replaced Mayer as commander of Gruppe. Three days later on 4 July, the United States Army Air Forces (USAAF) attacked the U-boat pens at La Pallice, Nantes and Le Mans. Defending against this attack, Huppertz shot down a Boeing B-17 Flying Fortress bomber. The next day, flying off of Brest, he claimed a RAF Armstrong Whitworth Whitley bomber shot down. On 3 August, RAF fighter-bombers attacked the Luftwaffe Brest-Guipavas Airfield. Defending against this attack, Huppertz shot down a Hawker Typhoon  fighter-bomber north of Brest. On 27 August, Huppertz claimed a North American B-25 Mitchell bomber shot down. On 30 August, Huppertz shot down a RAF North American P-51 Mustang fighter on a "Rhubarb" mission. The next day, he claimed a Spitfire fighter.

The Gruppe engaged in aerial combat with Martin B-26 Marauder bombers and their fighter escort heading for Rouen on 11 September. In this encounter, Huppertz claimed a Spitfire fighter shot down. Four days later, USAAF bombers headed for various industrial targets near Paris. That day, Huppertz shot down a B-17 bomber north of Saint-Germain-en-Laye. On 23 September, the USAAF VIII Bomber Command attacked Nantes, Vannes and Lorient. For the loss of four Fw 190 fighters, the Gruppe was credited with the destruction of two B-17 bombers, both of which attributed to Huppertz. The next day, Huppertz claimed a Spitfire destroyed.

On 14 October 1943, during the second Schweinfurt raid, Huppertz shot down a B-17 bomber southeast of Verdun. III. Gruppe flew in Defense of the Reich on 1 December when the VIII Bomber Command attacked Solingen that day. The Gruppe intercepted the bombers over Belgium where for the loss of two Fw 190 fighters, one B-17 was shot down by Huppertz. Huppertz received the German Cross in Gold on 26 December. Four days later, III. Gruppe intercepted VIII Bomber Command bombers on their bombing mission to Ludwigshafen. During this engagement, Huppertz claimed a Consolidated B-24 Liberator and a B-17 bomber shot down. The next day, the USAAF attacked various Luftwaffe airfields along the French Atlantic coast. That day, Huppertz was credited with a B-17 bomber shot down.

Group commander and death
On 20 February 1944, the first day of Big Week, Hupertz claimed the destruction of a B-17 bomber of the 91st Bombardment Group near Mons. Two days later, he shot down a B-24 bomber but was himself shot down in his Fw 190 A-7 (Werknummer 340275) and injured. A B-17 bomber shot down near Ulm on 18 March was his last four-engined heavy bomber claimed. In February 1944, Huppertz was appointed Gruppenkommandeur (group commander) of III. Gruppe of JG 2, succeeding Stolle who was transferred. Command of 11. Staffel was handed to Oberleutnant Jakob Schmitt. On 25 May, III. Gruppe moved to Fontenay-le-Comte.

According to Bowman, Huppertz shot down five P-51 fighters on 6 June, making him an "ace-in-a-day" on D-Day. In contrast, authors Mathews and Foreman list him with five claims over three Typhoon, a Republic P-47 Thunderbolt and a P-51 fighter that day. Author Page states that 29 fighters from JG 2 attacked more than 24 P-47 fighters from USAAF  365th Fighter Group and Typhoon fighters from the RAF No. 183 Squadron. In this combat, German pilots claimed six aerial victories, including two Typhoon fighters by Huppertz, for the loss of one German aircraft. Allied records indicate that two P-47 and three Typhoon fighters were lost. On another mission, Huppertz encountered eight Typhoon fighters from RAF No. 164 Squadron, claiming his third Typhoon of the day shot down. That evening, he claimed two further aerial victories, a P-51 and a P-47 fighter shot down.

Two days later, during Battle for Caen, Huppertz was shot down and killed in action in his Fw 190 A-8 (Werknummer 730440—factory number) by P-47 fighters near Cintheaux, in the combat area of Caen. He was replaced by Hauptmann Josef Wurmheller as commander of III. Gruppe. He was posthumously promoted to Major (major) and awarded the Knight's Cross of the Iron Cross with Oak Leaves on 24 June, the 512th officer or soldier of the Wehrmacht so honored.

Summary of career

Aerial victory claims
According to US historian David T. Zabecki, Huppertz was credited with 68 aerial victories. Spick also lists him with 68 aerial victories claimed in approximately 380 combat missions. Mathews and Foreman, authors of Luftwaffe Aces — Biographies and Victory Claims, researched the German Federal Archives and found records for 73 aerial victory claims, all of which confirmed. This number includes 28 on the Eastern Front and 45 on the Western Front, including 17 four-engined bombers.

Victory claims were logged to a map-reference (PQ = Planquadrat), for example "PQ 14 West 3867". These sectors were then subdivided into 36 smaller units to give a location area 3 × 4 km in size.

Awards
 Iron Cross (1939)
 2nd Class (30 May 1940)
 1st Class (9 October 1940)
 German Cross in Gold on 26 December 1943 as Hauptmann in the 8./Jagdgeschwader 2
 Knight's Cross of the Iron Cross with Oak Leaves
 Knight's Cross on 30 August 1941 as Leutnant and pilot in 12./Jagdgeschwader 51
 512th Oak Leaves on 24 June 1944 as Hauptmann and Gruppenkommandeur of III./Jagdgeschwader 2 "Richthofen"

Notes

References

Citations

Bibliography

 
 
 
 
 
 
 
 
 
 
 
 
 
 
 
 
 
 
 
 
 
 
 
 
 
 
 
 
 
 
 
 
 

1919 births
1944 deaths
Luftwaffe pilots
German World War II flying aces
Recipients of the Gold German Cross
Recipients of the Knight's Cross of the Iron Cross with Oak Leaves
Luftwaffe personnel killed in World War II
Aviators killed by being shot down
Burials at La Cambe German war cemetery
Military personnel from Mönchengladbach